Fort Howard Hospital is located within the Heritage Hill State Historical Park in Green Bay, Wisconsin. It was added to the National Register of Historic Places in 1979 for its historical significance in architectural, military and social history.

History
The United States Army built the hospital in the 1830s for Fort Howard. After the fort's decommissioning, the building was moved to the corner of Kellogg Street and Chestnut Street and was used as a private residence. In 1975, it was moved to its current location. Currently, it serves as a museum.

See also
List of the oldest buildings in Wisconsin

References

Hospital buildings completed in the 19th century
Military facilities on the National Register of Historic Places in Wisconsin
Defunct hospitals in Wisconsin
Museums in Brown County, Wisconsin
Federal architecture in Wisconsin
National Register of Historic Places in Brown County, Wisconsin
Hospitals established in the 1830s
1830s establishments in Wisconsin Territory